The Sentinel mine is a large copper mine located in north-west Zambia in North-Western Province, part of FQM Trident Ltd.

The mine is owned and operated by Canadian-based First Quantum Minerals, which purchased the rights to the project in 2010,  Construction began in June 2012, and the first product was extracted in August 2015, though full-scale production did not begin until November 2016.  The mine cost about $2.3 billion to build, and employs about 6,000 people.

Sentinel mine has a single reserve of copper ore, measuring an estimated 1.03 billion tons of ore with a copper content of 0.51%, or about 5.2 million tons of pure copper.  It is expected to yield about 300,000 tons of copper concentrate annually over a 15-year productive lifespan.

References 

Copper mines in Zambia